Ghislain Guessan (born 15 September 1992) is an Ivorian professional footballer who plays as a forward for Al-Minaa in Iraq Division One.

Club career

RC Arbaâ
Guessan joined RC Arbaâ in 2014 on a three-year contract. In his first season he played 12 games and scored a single goal against JS Saoura in a 2–1 win and reached the cup final but did not participate. The following season he played 24 matches and scored 10 goals. His first goal of the season was in a draw against JS Saoura and the last goal in a 3–1 win against MC Alger. Guessan left the club despite having a year left on his contract because of the club's relegation to the second division which forbids to bring in foreign players.

USM Alger
After two seasons with RC Arbaâ, Guessan joined to USM Alger, on a one-year contract. He joined on loan. His first goal with his new team was against the RC Relizane in a 6–0 win. after the piece won the first title in its history by winning the Super Cup against rivals MC Alger where he participated for 86 minutes. He then scored in the Algiers Derby against the same team, but USM Alger was defeated 2–1. The following week against JS Kabylie he scored another goal, after that missed scoring for three consecutive games until the derby against NA Hussein Dey where he scored two. He helped the team advance to the next round of the Algerian Cup scoring his sixth goal of the season against NT Souf. In the second half of the season, Guessan was unable to score a goal in 10 league games and in three Champions League matches. He officially left the club with 29 matches and 6 goals.

Viking
Guessan had a short stint with Norwegian club Viking in 2017. He went on trial with Scottish Premiership club Hearts in February 2018, but was not offered a contract.

In July 2019, Guessan joined Algerian Ligue Professionnelle 1 club CA Bordj Bou Arréridj.

International career
Guessan represented the Ivory Coast U20s at the 2011 Toulon Tournament.

Career statistics

Club

Honours

Club
USM Alger
 Algerian Super Cup: 2016

References

External links

 

Living people
1992 births
Footballers from Paris
Citizens of Ivory Coast through descent
Ivorian footballers
Ivory Coast under-20 international footballers
French footballers
French sportspeople of Ivorian descent
Association football forwards
USM Alger players
RC Arbaâ players
Viking FK players
CS Concordia Chiajna players
CA Bordj Bou Arréridj players
Al-Mina'a SC players
Liga I players
Algerian Ligue Professionnelle 1 players
Eliteserien players
Ivorian expatriate footballers
Expatriate footballers in Algeria
Ivorian expatriate sportspeople in Algeria
Expatriate footballers in Norway
Ivorian expatriate sportspeople in Norway
Expatriate footballers in Romania
Ivorian expatriate sportspeople in Romania
Expatriate footballers in Iraq
Ivorian expatriate sportspeople in Iraq